Cyril Edgar Ayling (October 1910 – 13 November 1993) was a cricketer who played for Argentina and was a member of the South American cricket team that toured England in 1932. He represented Argentina in three first-class matches against Sir Theodore Brinckman's XI in 1937-38, but also played in non-first-class representational matches for Argentina from 1930 to 1959. He was born in Buenos Aires.

Ayling was a middle-to-lower order right-handed batsman and a right-arm fast medium bowler. On the tour of England in 1932, his batting was not very successful in the six first-class matches, and his highest score was only 34. His bowling was better and he took 19 wickets in first-class games, with a best of five for 48 as he and his brother, Dennet Ayling, bowled the South American team to victory over Sir Julien Cahn's side at Nottingham. Outside the first-class games, he scored an unbeaten 95 and took five for 72 against MCC at Lord's; his innings averted the follow-on and his victims included Test player Eddie Dawson and former England captain Pelham Warner.

Against Brinckman's XI in 1937-38, Ayling played alongside Dennet and a third brother, Cecil Ayling. His highest score in three matches came in a rearguard action in the last of the three games, in which all three brothers reached 50 – in Cyril's case, exactly 50. His best bowling, four for 95, also came in this match.

Cyril Ayling continued to play high-level Argentinian cricket past his 50th birthday.

References
 Cyril Ayling at www.cricketarchive.com contains details of first-class and other matches, complete career statistics and scorecards
 Wisden Cricketers' Almanack, 1933 edition, page 508-520, reports on the South American tour to England in 1932.

Notes

1910 births
1993 deaths
Argentine cricketers
South Americans cricketers
Cricketers from Buenos Aires
Argentine people of British descent